Gülcan Koca (born 4 September 1990) is a retired Turkish-Australian women's football defender, who last played for Australian W-League team Melbourne Victory, and for Calder United in the  Football Federation Victoria.
She was a member of the Turkey women's national football team from 2010 to 2013.

Club career
Koca played for Melbourne Victory for nine W-League seasons from 2010 to 2018.   She was considered as one of the most versatile players on the team, as she was able to play as both an attacker and defender. She won the W-League Championship with the Victory in the 2013–14 season.

On September 13, 2018, Koca announced her retirement from professional football. She continues to play semi professionally with Calder united SC in the NPLW in victoria

International career
Koca was born in Melbourne to Turkish parents. She was called up to the Turkey women's national team in June 2010, after a worldwide search to find players with Turkish heritage. Koca made her debut for Turkey on June 23, 2010, at the 2011 World Cup Qualifying match against Austria team. She appeared in Euro 2013 qualifying matches. Koca has been capped 16 times by the national team.

Honors
Melbourne Victory
 W-League Championship: 2013–14

References

External links
 
 Melbourne Victory player profile

1990 births
Soccer players from Melbourne
Australian people of Turkish descent
Melbourne Victory FC (A-League Women) players
A-League Women players
Turkish women's footballers
Women's association football defenders
Turkey women's international footballers
Living people
Australian women's soccer players
Sportswomen from Victoria (Australia)